John Edward Uzzell (born 31 March 1959) is an English retired footballer who played as a full-back.

Uzzell spent the majority of his playing career with hometown club Plymouth Argyle, between July 1977 and April 1989.

He also played for Torquay United, between 1989 and 1992, before moving into coaching. In later life, he also worked as a postman.

On 14 December 1991, while playing in a Third Division game for Torquay United at Plainmoor, he suffered a fractured cheekbone and eye socket in a collision with Brentford striker Gary Blissett, who was subsequently charged with causing grievous bodily harm with intent. However, Blissett was cleared of the charge at Salisbury Crown Court on 3 December 1992.

He now lives in Ivybridge, South Devon.

References

External links
 Plymouth Argyle Official Website
 

1959 births
Living people
Footballers from Plymouth, Devon
English footballers
Association football defenders
Plymouth Argyle F.C. players
Torquay United F.C. players
English Football League players